RING finger protein 37 is a protein that in humans is encoded by the UBOX5 gene.

Interactions 

UBOX5 has been shown to interact with UBE2L3.

References

Further reading